South Township is a township in Madison County, Iowa, in the United States.

History
South Township was established in 1849.

References

Townships in Madison County, Iowa
Townships in Iowa
1849 establishments in Iowa